FHW may refer to:
 Freeman, Hardy and Willis, a British footwear retailer
 Foreign Armies West, a Nazi German military intelligence organization; see German code breaking in World War II
 Hanau West station, in Hanau, Germany